Bromance: My Brother's Romance is a 2013 Filipino screwball comedy satire film starring Zanjoe Marudo and Cristine Reyes. It is the first foray of Skylight Films into the comedy genre and is directed by Wenn V. Deramas. The film is based on a true story and premiered on May 15, 2013.

Synopsis
A young man is forced to pretend to be his estranged gay brother in order to keep a major business from falling through. Though he has always hated his brother, the young man gains a new appreciation as he lives his brother's life.

Cast

Main Cast
 Zanjoe Marudo as Brando/Brandy
 Cristine Reyes as Erika

Supporting Cast
 Arlene Muhlach as Vangie
 Boom Labrusca as Arn-Arn
 Manuel Chua as Jerome
 Joey Paras as Beergin
 Lassy Marquez as Tequi
 Atak Arana as Mr. Big
 Joy Viado† as Delilah
 Maricar De Mesa as Joyce
 Abby Bautista as Abby
 Nikki Valdez as Britney
 Carlo Romero as Rico
 Jeff Luna as Joey

Special Participation
 Maliksi Morales as Young Brandy/Brando
 Kokoy De Santos as Teen Brandy/Brando
 Beauty Gonzalez as Young Vangie
 Ai-Ai Delas Alas as the Columbarium Ghost
 Kris Aquino as the Doctor
 Vice Ganda as the Wedding Stopper
 Bea Alonzo as the Wedding Guest, Britney's (Nikki Valdez) friend
 John Lloyd Cruz as the Seminarian

Reception

Rating
The film was graded "B" by the Cinema Evaluation Board and rated PG by MTRCB.

Box Office
Bromance: My Brother's Romance landed on No. 2 on its opening weekend beaten by Star Trek Into Darkness on a small margin. Bromance earned P32,334,475 on its first 5 days of showing. After 3 weeks of showing, it grossed P74,511,438.

References

External links

Bromance: My Brother's Romance Official website

2013 films
Star Cinema films
Skylight Films films
Philippine comedy films
Philippine LGBT-related films
2010s screwball comedy films
Films directed by Wenn V. Deramas
Films about twin brothers
2013 comedy films
2013 LGBT-related films
LGBT-related comedy films